The Mumbai Academy of Moving Image (MAMI) is a public trust that organises the annual international film festival in Mumbai famously known as the Jio MAMI Mumbai Film Festival. Actor, producer and author Priyanka Chopra Jonas is the Chairperson while Anupama Chopra serves as the Festival Director.

Film festival
Jio MAMI Mumbai Film Festival is the most immersive and comprehensive programme that celebrates the diverse cinematic voices of our country through an international annual platform that instils pride in audiences and unites the film fraternity. The festival is organised by the Mumbai Academy of Moving Image (MAMI), which was founded by a group of film industry stalwarts in 1997 and was conceived and created with an aim to engage film lovers from all walks of life, and to foster an ideal climate of good cinema across the country by presenting the best of global and Indian cinema. The Academy’s vision is to celebrate cinema by hosting the annual international film festival in Mumbai, India's film and entertainment capital.

In the past few years, they have had incredible film talent like Fernando Meirelles, Ari Aster, Darren Aronofsky, Ava DuVernay, Sean Baker, John Madden and Lucrecia Martel at the festival. The festival programmes the best Indian and international films and also has a robust Year Round Programme under which t hey do screenings and talks throughout the year (physical and virtual).

The 21st edition of the festival was held on from 17th to 24th October 2019. The 2020 edition was postponed due the COVID-19 pandemic.

The online only edition of Jio MAMI 22nd Mumbai Film Festival will take place in March depending on how the COVID-19 situation is in India. The dates of the festival are 11th to 15th March 2022.

Awards
The following prizes are awarded to the feature-length films screening at the festival:
Golden Gateway Award: Films screening in the India Gold section are eligible for this award. It includes a trophy plus a cash prize of INR 15,00,000*. The cash prize is to be equally shared by the director(s) & producer(s). Silver Gateway Award: Films screening in the India Gold section are eligible for this award. It includes a trophy plus a cash prize of INR 8,00,000*. The cash prize is to be equally shared by the director(s) & producer(s).  Best Female Filmmaker: Films screening in the India Gold and Spotlight sections are eligible for this award. It includes a trophy plus a cash prize of INR 5,00,000*. The cash prize is to be equally shared by the director(s).  Audience Choice Award: Films screening in the World Cinema section are eligible for this award. This includes a trophy plus a cash prize of INR 10,00,000*. The cash prize is to be equally shared by the director(s).

The following prizes are awarded to the short-length films screening at the festival:
Golden Gateway Award: Films screening in the City Shorts Mumbai section are eligible for this award. It includes a trophy plus a cash prize of INR 1,00,000*. The cash prize is to be equally shared by the director(s). Silver Gateway Award: Films screening in the City Shorts Mumbai section are eligible for this award. It includes a trophy plus a cash prize of INR 50,000*. The cash prize is to be equally shared by the director(s).

Board of Trustees 
MAMI is chaired by Indian actress Priyanka Chopra Jonas. The other Trustees of MAMI are: 
Nita M. Ambani
Anupama Chopra
Ajay Bijli
Anand Mahindra
Anjali Menon
Farhan Akhtar
Isha Ambani
Kabir Khan
Kaustubh Dhavse
Kiran Rao
Rana Daggubati
Riteish Deshmukh
Rohan Sippy
Shivendra Singh Dungarpur
Siddharth Roy Kapur
Vikramaditya Motwane 
Vishal Bhardwaj 
Zoya Akhtar

References

External links

 
 List of Mumbai Film Festival awards

Organisations based in Mumbai
Film industry in Mumbai
Film organisations in India
Culture of Mumbai
Indian film festivals
Organizations with year of establishment missing